The Lights of Buenos Aires (Spanish: Luces de Buenos Aires) is a 1931 American-Argentine tango comedy film directed by Adelqui Millar. It was made at the Joinville Studios in Paris, where Paramount Pictures concentrated its foreign-language production during the early 1930s.

Cast
Carlos Gardel as Anselmo
Sofía Bozán as Elvira del Solar
Gloria Guzmán as Rosita
Pedro Quartucci as Pablo Soler
Carlos Martínez Baena as Empresario
Manuel Kuindós as Alberto Villamil
Marita Ángeles as Lily
Vicente Padula as Ciriaco
Jorge Infante as Romualdo
José Argüelles as Secretario

References

External links
 

American musical comedy films
1931 musical comedy films
1931 films
1930s Spanish-language films
Films directed by Adelqui Migliar
Films shot at Joinville Studios
Films set in Buenos Aires
American black-and-white films
Argentine black-and-white films
1930s American films
1930s Argentine films